OVD-Info is an independent Russian human rights media project aimed at combating political persecution.

History 
OVD-Info was founded in December 2011 by Moscow journalist Grigory Okhotin and programmer Daniil Beilinson. They witnessed mass arrests of participants in the rally on December 5, 2011 against the rigging of parliamentary elections. First, they posted on Facebook the total number of detainees and their names. Seeing the demand for their work, by December 10, on the eve of the rally on Bolotnaya Square in Moscow, they launched the OVD-Info website. The name of the project comes from the abbreviation Department of Internal Affairs.

Since February 1, 2013, the main partner of the project is the Memorial Human Rights Center.

On 29 September 2021 the Ministry of Justice of the Russian Federation designated OVD-Info as a "foreign agent". Critics say the decision is designed to stifle dissent.

On 25 December 2021 the Federal Service for Supervision of Communications, Information Technology and Mass Media (Roskomnadzor) blocked the website of OVD-Info after a court ruling. A representative for OVD-Info said that they had not received any notifications from the government and the reason for the blocking was unknown to them.

During the 2022 Russian invasion of Ukraine, OVD-Info kept track of Russians who were imprisoned because they protested against war and mobilization .

Activities

Monitoring 
OVD-Info monitors politically motivated persecutions and cases of abuse of authority by Russian police officers towards detainees. OVD-Info publishes information in the form of express news and stories told by the victims themselves.

Legal assistance 
The project provides legal assistance in the form of legal advice and a round-the-clock telephone hotline (through the hotline the project receives most of the information, which it then publishes in its bulletins on the website), visits of a lawyer to the police department, legal assistance in courts (up to filing a complaint to European Court of Human Rights).

Informing 
The project monitors cases of violence against political prisoners by Federal Penitentiary Service. The website also maintains a mailing list with reports on political persecution in Russia.

OVD-Info publishes lists of detainees by police departments to which they were delivered. In 2018, the project assisted 660 people in police departments, about 200 people in administrative and 32 in criminal cases.

The project covers events at many protests in Russia. In particular, OVD-Info published detailed statistics on arrests at anti-corruption protests in March 2017, at protests against raising the retirement age in 2018. In June 2019, the project played a significant role in drawing public attention to the case of journalist Ivan Golunov. At the same time, the project itself managed to become more widely known — on June 12, 2019, OVD-Info received an average monthly amount of donations in one day.

Research 
The project also publishes reports summarizing the practice of violations of the law regarding rallies and against civic activists by the Russian authorities. In 2018—2019, reports were published on the topic of bans of rallies in Russian cities.

Functioning and financing 
As of June 2019, OVD-Info employs 28 people and another 300 people are volunteers. OVD-Info, due to limited resources, provides assistance only to those who find themselves under administrative or criminal prosecution as a result of expressing their civil position. The project is aimed at the development of civil society institutions and mechanisms of public control of the authorities and law enforcement agencies in Russia.

The project is funded by voluntary donations from individuals, as well as assistance from the organization Memorial, the European Commission and the International Partnership for Human Rights (institutional donors provide about 70% of the budget). In 2018, OVD-Info managed to raise more than 19.8 million rubles, of which about 5.66 million were crowdfunded. Russian banks — Tinkoff, Alfa-Bank and  — refused OVD-Info acquiring to collect donations. In 2013, the  demanded that Memorial register as a foreign agent, since it receives funding from abroad to support the OVD-Info project, which was regarded by the prosecutor's office as political. According to the prosecutor's office, some of OVD-Info's data on politically motivated persecutions is not objective. OVD-Info says that it has no political orientation.

Awards 
July 2019: Redkollegia.

2020: .

2021: Civil Rights Defender of the Year. Leonid Drabkin, Operations Coordinator of OVD-Info, was selected to be a winner in the Forbes 30 Under 30 list in the Social practices category.

References

External links 
  

Internet properties established in 2011
Human rights organizations based in Russia
Memorial (society)
Redkollegia award winners
Unregistered public associations listed in Russia as foreign agents
Russian-language websites